The Head (Rais) of the Republic of Tatarstan, formerly known as the President of the Republic of Tatarstan (1991–2023), is the head of the republic and the highest official of Tatarstan, a federal subject of Russia. The office was established in 1991.

Title 
In 2017, following the expiration of the 1994 agreement between Moscow and Kazan which granted Tatarstan substantial autonomy, the title of president was expected to be replaced with head, as it was done with other republics in Russia. The government of Tatarstan however resisted attempts to have the title abolished and the federal government declined to press the issue. 

However, shortly after legislative elections in September 2021, deputies in the State Duma prepared a bill to unify the titles of the leaders of all of Russia's regions to head. The bill, seen as directly aimed at Tatarstan, would reserve the title of president exclusively for the president of Russia. In response, lawmakers in Tatarstan's State Council voted against it. The bill was approved in its first reading in November. On 15 December, it was approved by the Federation Council and subsequently signed by president Vladimir Putin on 21 December. 

The law went into effect on 1 June 2022. Tatarstan's presidential secretary said that the title would remain during a transitional period throughout 2022 where the constitution was to be amended. The renaming of the post was expected to be completed by 2023. The loss of the title was perceived by many in Tatarstan as a further erosion of their autonomy within Russia.

In December 2022, regional lawmakers voted to change the title of the head of the republic from president to rais (an Arabic title for "leader"). The title of president was seen as the last remaining symbol of federalism following the centralization reforms under Vladimir Putin. Incumbent president Rustam Minnikhanov however would have retained the title of president until his term expired in 2025 under transitional agreements. On 26 January 2023 Minnikhanov signed the amendments into law; however, the proposed transitional period was abandoned, forcing the title change to occur by February 6.

List of presidents

Latest election
The latest election for the office was held on 13 September 2020.

References

 
Politics of Tatarstan
Tatarstan